Elixir Press is an American, independent, nonprofit literary press located in Denver, Colorado. The press was founded by Dana Curtis in Minneapolis, Minnesota, in 2000 and relocated to Denver in 2004.

Authors published by Elixir Press include Diann Blakely, Bruce Bond, Amina Gautier, Erin Hoover, Sarah Kennedy, Kathryn Nuernberger, Jane Satterfield, Seth Brady Tucker, Anthony Varallo, and Jake Adam York. Elixir Press titles have been reviewed in venues including Publishers Weekly and the New York Times Book Review. Diann Blakely's book, Cities of Flesh and the Dead, won the Alice Fay di Castagnola Award from the Poetry Society of America. Books published by Elixir Press have won awards from the Chicago Public Library and The Independent Publisher Book Awards, as well as being nominated as a finalist for the Colorado Book Awards in Poetry.

Elixir Press holds three national book contests open to authors writing in English. Each prize offers a cash award and publication of the winning manuscript. Each year the Elixir Poetry Book Awards features a Judge's Prize and an Editors' Prize competition open to all poets. Begun in 2006, the Elixir Press Fiction Award is presented to the writer of a novel or short story collection every two years. The Antivenom Prize has been awarded annually for first or second books of poetry since 2009.

References

External links 
 Official website
 Council of Literary Magazines and Presses > Directory of Member Publishers

Literary publishing companies
Poetry publishers
Book publishing companies of the United States
Book publishing companies based in Colorado